Early Recordings is a compilation album series by Louisville, Kentucky rock band My Morning Jacket.  It was released in 2004 on Darla Records. The two constituent albums, called chapters, are called The Sandworm Cometh and Learning respectively. Danny Cash created the graphic design to both albums and played bass and keyboard on the second. J. Glenn performed drums for the series and Johnny Quaid played guitar. "Two-Tone" Tommy played bass for the first album, but Quaid took over for the second.

The Sandworm Cometh

Track listing

Personnel
My Morning Jacket
Jim James – vocals, guitar, bass, drums, keyboards, production
Johnny Quaid – guitar on track 1
Two Tone Tommy – bass on track 1
J. Glenn – drums on track 1

Additional
Danny Cash – graphic design

Learning

Track listing

Personnel
My Morning Jacket
Jim James – vocals, guitar, production
Carl Broemel – guitar
Two Tone Tommy – bass
Bo Koster – keyboards
J. Glenn – drums

Additional
Danny Cash – bass, keyboards, graphic design

References

External links
 
 

My Morning Jacket compilation albums
Compilation album series
2004 compilation albums
Darla Records compilation albums
Albums produced by Jim James